Marco Torralva (born August 17, 1996) is an American soccer player who currently plays as a midfielder.

Career

College and amateur
Torralva attended Central High School before going on to play college soccer at the University of California, Merced in 2014, where he went on to make 74 appearances, scoring 11 goals and tallying 14 assists. In his senior year, he earned a Cal Pac Honorable Mention.

Following his college career, Torralva played in the NPSL side Academica SC, where he made 14 appearances and scored a single goal across the 2019 and 2021 seasons, with the 2020 season cancelled due to the COVID-19 pandemic. In 2021, he also played with Valley FC of UPSL during their inaugural and undefeated season, helping the team to the conference title.

Central Valley Fuego
On February 20, 2022, Torralva signed his first professional contract, joining USL League One team Central Valley Fuego ahead of their inaugural season. He made his debut for Fuego on July 14, 2022, starting in a 1–0 win over Northern Colorado Hailstorm.

References

External links

1996 births
Living people
American soccer players
Association football midfielders
Central Valley Fuego FC players
National Premier Soccer League players
Soccer players from California
Sportspeople from Fresno, California
United Premier Soccer League players
USL League One players